The IBU Cup in biathlon has been held since the winter seasons of 1982–83 and 1988–89, for women and men, respectively. Until the 2007–08 season this competition was called European Cup. It is the second-rank competition in biathlon after the Biathlon World Cup. The IBU Cup season lasts from November/December to March, with contests in a different venue almost every week.

Competition
The IBU Cup season lasts from November–December to March, with meetings in a different venue every week excluding some holidays and a couple of weeks before IBU Open European Championships. All in all, the season comprises seven to nine meetings, with events taking place from Wednesday–Thursday through Sunday. Mixed relay competitions are held three time per season.  

The athlete with the highest overall total score (i.e. total score for all disciplines) of the IBU Cup season is awarded the Big Crystal Globe trophy.  A Small Crystal Globe trophy is awarded for the first place in the season total for each discipline.  Hence, it is possible for an athlete to win both the Big Crystal Globe and Small Crystal Globes for the same World Cup season.

Scoring system
The tables given below provide an overview of the highest-ranking biathletes and nations of each WC season. For each event, a first place gives 60 points, a 2nd place – 54 pts, a 3rd place – 48 pts, a 4th place – 43 pts, a fifth place – 40 pts, a 6th place – 38 pts, 7th – 36 pts, 8th – 34 points, 9th – 32 points, 10th – 31 points, then linearly decreasing by one point down to the 40th place. Equal placings (ties) give an equal number of points. The sum of all WC points of the season, less the points from an IBU-predetermined number of events (e.g. 2), gives the biathlete's total WC score.

Results
 Romanization of Cyrillic script-based names follows the IBU's athlete records.
 See the List of IOC country codes for expansions of country abbreviations.

Men's overall

 Statistics by country

Women's overall

 Statistics by country

External links 
 IBU Cup

 
Biathlon competitions
Recurring sporting events established in 1982
Sports competition series